Siguiri (N’ko: ߛߌ߯ߙߌ߲߫ ; Arabic: سِجِرِ ِ) is a city in northeastern Guinea on the River Niger. It is a sub-prefecture and capital of Siguiri Prefecture in the Kankan Region. Its population was estimated at 28,319 in 2008.

It is known for its goldsmiths and as the birthplace of Sekouba Bambino Diabaté.

Placer gold is mined here. North and northwest of Siguiri, and along the Tinkisso River, is the Bouré region.  This region replaced Bambouk as a major gold producer in the 11th-12th centuries.  Gold is also found along the Sankarani River.

This is the place where Sundiata Keita fought Soumaoro Kanté, and located here is a former French fort built in 1888, and the Siguiri Airport.

Climate
Siguiri has a tropical savanna climate (Köppen climate classification Aw).

See also
Birimian

References

External links
 Spinning around the source. Slumbering stories in and around Siguiri.  Article by Rachel Laget based on anthropological field research. (www.xpeditions.eu)
 Mining for Gold in Siguiri: A Close Look at a High-Risk Population - USAID

Communities on the Niger River
Sub-prefectures of the Kankan Region